The 1999 Northwestern Oklahoma State Rangers football team was an American football team that represented the Northwestern Oklahoma State University as an independent during the 1999 NAIA football season. In their third season under head coach Tim Albin, the Rangers compiled a perfect 13–0 record and won the NAIA national championship.  

In the NAIA National Championship Game, the Rangers faced , falling by a 20-0 score at halftime, then coming back for a 34-26 victory. Rangers quarterback Al Hunt tallied 129 rushing yards and 140 passing yards and was named Offensive Player of the Game. Linebacker Daryl Richardson was selected as the Defensive Player of the Game. It was the first national title in Northwestern Oklahoma State program history.

After the season, coach Albin was honored as the NAIA coach of the year by American Football Coach magazine.

The team's perfect season extended the school's winning streak to 18 games, dating back to September 1998.

Schedule

References

Northwestern Oklahoma State Rangers
Northwestern Oklahoma State Rangers football seasons
NAIA Football National Champions
College football undefeated seasons
Northwestern Oklahoma State Rangers football